Sant'Antonio Abate is a Romanesque-style, Roman Catholic church, located facing Piazza Sant'Antonio in Pisa, region of Tuscany, Italy.

History 
The church was founded in 1341 with an adjacent convent. It was nearly destroyed during World War II, and was rebuilt after the war. The inferior façade, in two colors of marble, was the design product of Lupo, Giovanni di Gante, and Simone di Matteo of Siena.

Mural 
On a rear wall of the convent, facing Via Zandonai, is a vast 1989 mural, titled Tuttomondo, by Keith Haring. The mural was one of the last public works by Haring.

Gallery

References

Antonio Abate
Antonio Abate
14th-century Roman Catholic church buildings in Italy